Three provincial by-elections were held in Quebec in 2010 to fill vacancies in the National Assembly.

Vachon

The district of Vachon was vacated by Parti Québécois MNA Camil Bouchard on January 6, 2010. The by-election took place on July 5, 2010. The riding was held by the PQ.

|-

|Liberal
|Simon-Pierre Diamond
|align="right"|3,236
|align="right"|24.34
|align="right"|-7.94

|-

|-

|-

|Independent
|Denis Durand
|align="right"|98
|align="right"|0.74
|align="right"|-2.42
|-

|Independent
|Régent Millette
|align="right"|71
|align="right"|0.53
|align="right"|-
|}

Saint-Laurent

The district of Saint-Laurent was vacated by Liberal MNA Jacques Dupuis on August 9, 2010. The by-election took place on September 13, 2010.

The Gazette, the main English newspaper in Montreal, took the unusual step of endorsing Action démocratique du Québec candidate Jose Fiorillo over Quebec Liberal Party candidate Jean-Marc Fournier, calling Fournier a parachute candidate who deserved to be rejected by the voters. Despite this, the riding was held by the Liberals.

|-
 
|Liberal
|Jean-Marc Fournier
|align="right"|7,126
|align="right"|64.01
|align="right"|-10.38

|-

|}

Kamouraska-Témiscouata
The district of Kamouraska-Témiscouata was vacated by Liberal MNA Claude Béchard on September 7 due to his pancreatic cancer, which he died from later the same day. The by-election took place on November 29.

The riding was captured by the PQ, reflecting the Liberals' declining popularity due in part to their refusal to hold a public inquiry into construction industry corruption. In response to the by-election results, Premier Jean Charest announced he would create a permanent unit to investigate corruption in the construction industry.

|-
 
|Liberal
|France Dionne
|align="right"|7,017
|align="right"|35.85
|align="right"|-17.85

|-

|}

References

2010 elections in Canada
Elections in Quebec
Provincial by-elections in Quebec
2010 in Quebec